The Old Pittston Congregational Church (also previously known as the First Congregational Church of Pittston) is a historic church building on Pittston School Street in Pittston, Maine.  Built in 1836, it is an architecturally distinctive blend of Federal, Greek Revival, and Gothic Revival architecture, and was listed on the National Register of Historic Places in 1978.  The congregation, organized in 1812 by Major Reuben Colburn, now meets at 21 Arnold Road.  It is affiliated with the Conservative Congregational Christian Conference.

Description and history
The Old Pittston Congregational Church stands in a small crossroads village south of the main village of Pittston.  It is located on the east side of Pittston School Street (a former alignment of Maine State Route 27), just north of its junction with East Pittston Road (Maine State Route 194), and northeast of that road's junction with the current alignment of SR 27.  It is a 1-1/2 story rectangular wood frame building, with a gabled roof, clapboard siding, and granite foundation.  The front facade, facing west, has six Doric pilasters supporting an entablature, with a fully pedimented gable above.  There are two doorways between two pairs of pilasters, each topped by a sash window with a fixed rounded top.  Similar windows adorn the building sides.  Rising from the roof is a two-stage square tower, its upper stage housing a belfry with round-arch louvered openings.

Pittston's First Congregational Church was organized in 1812 by Major Reuben Colburn, who lived to the south, and is best known for his work assisting Benedict Arnold's expedition to Quebec in the American Revolutionary War.  This church was built in 1836, and represents a distinctive blending of architectural styles.  Its basic form is Federal, but its facade has Greek Revival elements, with Gothic style windows.  Historic documentation indicates that the church tower was once adorned by corner pinnacles, also a Gothic feature.  The building was used by the congregation until 1894, when it relocated to a more centrally located facility.  The congregation currently meets at 21 Arnold Street, just north of the Major Reuben Colburn House.

See also
National Register of Historic Places listings in Kennebec County, Maine

References

External links
First Congregational Church of Pittston website
HISTORY OF GARDINER, PITTSTON AND WEST GARDINER by J.W. Hanson (1852), pg. 267-271

Churches on the National Register of Historic Places in Maine
Federal architecture in Maine
Churches completed in 1836
19th-century churches in the United States
Churches in Kennebec County, Maine
Conservative Congregational Christian Conference churches in Maine
National Register of Historic Places in Kennebec County, Maine